This is a list of places in Scotland which have standing links to local communities in other countries. In most cases, the association, especially when formalised by local government, is known as "town twinning" (usually in Europe) or "sister cities" (usually in the rest of the world).

A
Aberdeen

 Bulawayo, Zimbabwe
 Clermont-Ferrand, France

 Regensburg, Germany
 Stavanger, Norway

Aberdour
 Corte Franca, Italy

Abernethy
 Grisy-Suisnes, France

Aboyne
 Martignas-sur-Jalle, France

Airdrie
 Stanley, Falkland Islands

Angus

 Sigulda, Latvia
 Yantai, China

Annan
 Watermael-Boitsfort, Belgium

Anstruther
 Bapaume, France

Argyll and Bute
 Amberg-Sulzbach (district), Germany

Ayr
 Saint-Germain-en-Laye, France

B
Birnam
 Asheville, United States

Blairgowrie and Rattray

 Fergus (Centre Wellington), Canada
 Pleasanton, United States

Bonnyrigg
 Saint-Cyr-l'École, France

Bothwell
 Jouy-en-Josas, France

Burntisland
 Flekkefjord, Norway

C
Carnoustie
 Maule, France

Clackmannanshire

 Espartinas, Spain
 Vendargues, France

Coatbridge
 Saint-Denis, France

Coldstream
 Bennecourt, France

Comrie
 Carleton Place, Canada

Crieff
 Wellington, United States

Cumbernauld
 Bron, France

D
Dalgety Bay and Hillend
 Ócsa, Hungary

Dalkeith
 Jarnac, France

Danderhall
 Angres, France

Dull

 Bland, Australia
 Boring, United States

Dumfries

 Annapolis, United States
 Cantù, Italy
 Gifhorn, Germany

Dunbar

 Lignières, France
 Martinez, United States

Dundee

 Alexandria, United States
 Dubai, United Arab Emirates
 Nablus, Palestine
 Orléans, France
 Würzburg, Germany
 Zadar, Croatia
 West Dundee, United States

Dunfermline

 Albufeira, Portugal
 Logroño, Spain
 Sarasota, United States
 Trondheim, Norway
 Vichy, France
 Wilhelmshaven, Germany

Dunkeld
 Asheville, United States

Duns
 Żagań, Poland

E
Earlston
 Cappella Maggiore, Italy

East Ayrshire
 Joué-lès-Tours, France

East Dunbartonshire

 Corbeil-Essonnes, France
 Yoichi, Japan

East Kilbride
 Ballerup, Denmark

East Lothian

 Barga, Italy 
 Spree-Neiße (district), Germany

East Renfrewshire
 Albertslund, Denmark

Edinburgh

 Aalborg, Denmark
 Dunedin, New Zealand
 Florence, Italy
 Kraków, Poland
 Kyiv, Ukraine
 Munich, Germany
 Nice, France
 San Diego, United States
 Shenzhen, China
 Vancouver, Canada
 Xi'an, China

Edzell
 Sauze d'Oulx, Italy

Elgin
 Landshut, Germany

Ellon
 Chièvres, Belgium

Embo
 Maui County, United States

Errol
 Mardié, France

Eyemouth
 Marle, France

F
Falkirk

 Chełmno, Poland
 Créteil, France
 Odenwald (district), Germany

 San Rafael, United States

Fochabers
 Magnac-sur-Touvre, France

Fife
 Gansu, China

Forfar
 Chabanais, France

Forres

 Goslar, Germany
 Mount Dora, United States

Fort William
 Dudley, England, United Kingdom

Fraserburgh
 Bressuire, France

G
Girvan
 Torcy, France

Glasgow

 Bethlehem, Palestine
 Dalian, China
 Havana, Cuba
 Lahore, Pakistan
 Marseille, France
 Nuremberg, Germany
 Pittsburgh, United States

 Turin, Italy

Glenrothes
 Böblingen, Germany

Grangemouth
 La Porte, United States

H
Haddington
 Aubigny-sur-Nère, France

Hamilton
 Châtellerault, France

Hawick
 Bailleul, France

Helensburgh
 Thouars, France

I
Innerleithen
 Le Nouvion-en-Thiérache, France

Inverness

 Augsburg, Germany
 La Baule-Escoublac, France
 Saint-Valery-en-Caux, France

Inverurie
 Bagneres-de-Bigorre, France

Irvine
 Voisins-le-Bretonneux, France

J
Jedburgh
 Malestroit, France

K
Kelso

 Kelso, United States
 Orchies, France

Kilmacolm
 Mérignies, France

Kilmarnock

 Alès, France
 Herstal, Belgium
 Kulmbach, Germany

Kilsyth
 Meulan-en-Yvelines, France

Kinross
 Gacé, France

Kirkcaldy
 Ingolstadt, Germany

Kirkwall
 Moena, Italy

Kirriemuir
 Volvic, France

L
Lanark
 Yvetot, France

Largs
 Andernos-les-Bains, France

Larkhall
 Seclin, France

Lasswade
 Saint-Cyr-l'École, France

Lerwick
 Måløy (Kinn), Norway

Letham

 Léguillac-de-l'Auche, France
 Monasterboice, Ireland

Leven

 Bruges, France
 Holzminden, Germany

Linlithgow
 Guyancourt, France

Loanhead
 Harnes, France

Lossiemouth
 Hersbruck, Germany

Lower Largo
 Robinson Crusoe Island (Juan Fernández Islands), Chile

Lybster
 Mackinac Island, United States

M
Maybole

 Belœil, Belgium
 Crosne, France
 Schotten, Germany

Moffat
 Montreuil-sur-Ille, France

Monifieth
 Soyaux, France

Montrose
 Luzarches, France

Musselburgh

 Champigny-sur-Marne, France
 Rosignano Marittimo, Italy

N
Newport-on-Tay
 Zolotarevo, Ukraine

North Ayrshire
 Uddevalla, Sweden

North Lanarkshire

 Campi Bisenzio, Italy
 Schweinfurt, Germany

O
Oban

 Gorey, Ireland
 Laurinburg, United States

Orkney
 Hordaland, Norway

P
Paisley

 Fürth, Germany
 Gladsaxe, Denmark

Peebles
 Hendaye, France

Penicuik
 L'Isle-sur-la-Sorgue, France

Perth

 Aschaffenburg, Germany
 Bydgoszcz, Poland
 Cognac, France
 Haikou, China
 Perth, Australia
 Perth, Canada

Peterhead
 Ålesund, Norway

Pitlochry
 Confolens, France

Prestwick

 Ariccia, Italy
 Lichtenfels, Germany
 Vandalia, United States

S
Selkirk
 Plattling, Germany

South Ayrshire
 Newnan, United States

South Lanarkshire
 Hemmingen, Germany

St Andrews
 Loches, France

Stepps
 Les Marches, France

Stirling

 Dunedin, United States
 Keçiören, Turkey
 Óbuda-Békásmegyer (Budapest), Hungary
 Summerside, Canada
 Villeneuve-d'Ascq, France

Stonehaven

 Achères, France
 Athens, United States

Stornoway
 Pendleton, United States

T
Thurso
 Brilon, Germany

Troon
 Villeneuve-sur-Lot, France

W
West Dunbartonshire
 Argenteuil, France

West Lothian

 Grapevine, United States
 Hochsauerland (district), Germany

Wick
 Klaksvík, Faroe Islands

References

Scotland
Cities in Scotland
Scotland-related lists
Scotland, Twin towns and sister cities
Foreign relations of Scotland
Scotland geography-related lists
Populated places in Scotland